Howard Primrose Whidden (July 12, 1871 – March 30, 1952) was a Canadian churchman, member of Parliament, educator, scholar, avid skier, and editor of Canadian Baptist.

Born in Antigonish Harbour, Nova Scotia, became a Baptist minister in Dayton, Ohio, and likely knew John D. Rockefeller. Whidden was president of Brandon College, Brandon, Manitoba.

He sat in the House of Commons of Canada for four years as a member of the Robert Borden/Conservative led Union government of 1917 (which gave women the right to vote). He was appointed in 1923 sixth Chancellor of McMaster University, then in Toronto, Ontario; and served for 18 years to 1941, making him the longest-serving chancellor or president, to that time. Whidden Hall at McMaster University is named after Chancellor Whidden, as is the Whidden scholarship at McMaster University.

He died in Toronto, Ontario, and was buried 2 April 1952 at Mount Pleasant Cemetery, Toronto.

Timeline 
 ca 1880   educated in the public schools, Antigonish, Nova Scotia
 1891      BA, graduate Acadia University, Wolfville, Nova Scotia
 1894      theology, McMaster University, Toronto, Ontario
 ca 1895   University of Chicago, Illinois
 1894-96   Baptist Church, Morden, Manitoba
 1897-1900 Baptist Church, Galt, Ontario
 1898-1900 lecturer, McMaster University, Toronto, Ontario
 1900-1903 professor of Biblical literature and English, Brandon College, Brandon, Manitoba
 1904-1912 pastor, First Baptist Church, Dayton, Ohio
 1912-1923 president, Brandon College, Brandon, Manitoba
 1917      first elected to House of Commons, Brandon riding, supporter Unionist government
 1923-1941 Chancellor, McMaster University, Toronto and Hamilton, Ontario, longest serving chancellor or president
 1936      honorary doctorate DD, Victoria University (now Victoria College, University of Toronto)

Family

He was the son of Charles Blanchard and Eunice Caroline (Graham) Whidden.

Howard married Katherine "Kit" Louise Ganong (daughter of James H. Ganong and Susan E. (Brittain) Ganong) born February 14, 1870, in Malden, Massachusetts. Her sister, Susie, was the proprietor and Principal of the Netherwood School for girls in Rothesay, New Brunswick. Kit Whidden died on April 4, 1959, at the home of her son in Wolfville, Nova Scotia, and was buried on April 8, 1959, beside her husband and daughter Susan in Mount Pleasant Cemetery, Toronto.

Howard and Catherine had eight children:

Charles Ganong (22 August 1895 - 27 July 1978
Susan Gwendolyn (5 January 1897 in Waterloo, Ontario - 1963) buried in Mt. Pleasant cemetery, Toronto, Ontario.
Dr. Rev. Evan McDonald Whidden (9 July 1898 - 11 March 1980)
James Gilbert (13 January 1901 in Brandon, Manitoba - 15 April 1901)
William Francis (19 March 1902 in Brandon, Manitoba - 4 July 1905)
Prof. Reginald Wilbur born 18 December 1904
Bruce Cuthbert (29 March 1909 - 17 March 1972)
Howard Primrose, Ph.D., LL.D. (4 August 1910 - 12 March 1977).  He was a senior editor of Business Week magazine.

1871 births
1952 deaths
20th-century Canadian Baptist ministers
Unionist Party (Canada) MPs
Members of the House of Commons of Canada from Nova Scotia
Academic staff of McMaster University
Chancellors of McMaster University
People from Antigonish, Nova Scotia
Ganong family
19th-century Canadian Baptist ministers